Bida is a Local Government Area in Niger State, Nigeria and a city on the A124 highway which occupies most of the area.

The postal code of the area is 912.

The city
Bida is the second largest city in Niger State with an estimated population of 178,840 (2007). It is located southwest of Minna, capital of Niger State, and is a dry, arid town.

Districts include Katcha, Enagi, Baddeggi, Agaie, Pategi, Lemu, Kutigi, and others.

There are other places in Bida such as Bamisu estate, Ramatu dangana, ECWA poly road, Small Market, Main Market and the Federal Medical Centre (Bida) others. There are also different schools like Federal Government Girls College Bida, Federal Polytechnic Staff Secondary School,  Government College, Bida and others.

Economy 
The town is known for its production of traditional crafts, notably glass, bronze articrafts and brass wares. Bida is also known for its Durbar festival and the Nupe Day Festival. It is also the home to the Federal Polytechnic, Bida, Federal Medical Centre and Niger State School of Nursing.

Ethnicity 
The major ethnic group is the Nupe. Bida is the headquarters of the Nupe Kingdom led by the Etsu Nupe (presently Etsu Yahaya Abubakar). The leadership style of the ancient town of Bida is emirship, and the head of the town is addressed as Etsu Nupe.
Other tribes include Igbo, Yoruba, Hausa, Igala and Gbagi, Ibira.

See also
Federal Medical Centre (Bida)
Federal Polytechnic Bida

References

External links

Local Government Areas in Niger State